A rice noodle roll, also known as a steamed rice roll and cheung fun, is a Cantonese dish originating from Guangdong Province in southern China, commonly served as either a snack, small meal or variety of dim sum. It is a thin roll made from a wide strip of shahe fen (rice noodles), filled with shrimp, beef, vegetables, or other ingredients. Seasoned soy saucesometimes with siu mei drippingsis poured over the dish upon serving. When plain and made without filling, the rice noodle is also known as jyu cheung fun, literally "pork intestine noodle", a reference to its resemblance of a pig's intestines. There is no official recording of the history of rice noodle rolls; most cookbooks claim that it was first made in the 1930s. In Guangzhou, Guangdong Province, people called the dish laai cheung because it is a noodle roll that pulled by hand.

Preparation
The rice noodle sheets are made from a mixture of rice flour and tapioca or glutinous rice flour and water. The mixture has the consistency of  heavy cream. The rice flour provided bulk and flavor, while the tapioca flour gives the noodle elasticity and springiness. The tapioca or glutinous rice flour may be omitted when using rice flour made from certain kinds of aged rice, as chemical changes in the aged rice produce the same texture as the addition of the second starch.

This liquid mixture is poured into a specially made flat pan with holes (similar to a flat colander). Commercial restaurants instead use special oversized steamers that are lined with a steam-permeable cloth. The noodle mixture is steamed in the pan from the bottom up to produce the square rice noodle sheets. The noodles are typically very thin (roughly  thickness).

Once the liquid mixture is ladled and set, fillings such as shrimp or beef may be added before the noodle is fully cooked. As the noodle is cooking, it will start to set around the filling and take hold without falling out when transferring from steamer to dish. After steaming for several minutes, the entire freshly steamed noodle sticks to the cloth and must be scraped off, usually on to a metal surface with a thin coat of oil to prevent sticking. The resulting noodle is lightly folded about three times. Traditionally, the noodles are  finished with the addition of a warm, sweetened soy sauce just before serving. Cantonese/Hong Kong style Cheungfan is usually lightly folded when there is filling inside.

The actual noodle by itself has little flavor. The fillings and the soy sauce that accompanies it provides the bulk of the flavor. Traditional fillings are marinated fresh or dried shrimp, beef (heavily mixed with rice flour), or pork and chopped green onions.

The rice noodle roll is generally served in "threes" and usually scored to reveal the filling inside. Most other countries  will roll them plain with no filling inside and instead serve them with toppings and a thick sauce on top. The rice noodle roll is served hot and fresh and accompanied with a splash of plain or flavoured (fried shallot) oil with a generous amount of warm sweet soy sauce added right before serving. Most establishments will have a slightly different flavor of sweet soy sauce such as an addition of hoisin sauce.

Regional

Cantonese cuisine

In Cantonese cuisine, rice noodle rolls are most often served in dim sum. The most common types traditionally offered as part of dim sum cuisine are:

 Beef rice noodle roll
 Shrimp rice noodle roll
Dried shrimp rice noodle roll
Char siu rice noodle roll
Zhaliang

Other modern varieties that may be offered include:

 Rice noodle roll with chicken and bitter melon
 Rice noodle roll with conpoy and pea shoot
 Rice noodle roll with fish
 Stir-fried rice noodle roll with XO sauce

A version of cheungfan notably absent outside of Guangzhou is the sliced meat filling variety. This variety is typically found in street side restaurants as a meal in itself, and uses whole meat pieces, typically beef or pork, rather than ground meat. Prior to rolling the crepe, briefly blanched lettuce or romaine is added as part of the filling, giving the cheungfan a crunch as well as volume.

Southeast Asian cuisine
The Malaysian Penang style chee cheong fun is served with a shrimp paste called hae ko in the Hokkien dialect and petis udang in the Malay language.

In Ipoh, chee cheong fun is mainly served in two ways, the dry or wet versions. In the dry version, it is served with bright red sweet sauce and in most cases, chilli sauce as well as pickled green chilli. In the wet version, it is served with curry with pork rind and long bean or minced meat and shiitake mushroom gravy. Both dry or wet versions are topped with sesame seeds and fried shallots.

Teluk Intan, one of the towns in the state of Perak, has other variations of chee cheong fun that contain turnips, shallots and deep-fried shrimp.

Chee cheong fun is a popular breakfast food in Singapore and Malaysia. Chee cheong fun is frequently served in kopitiams and Chinese restaurants. Chee cheong fun can also be found in Bagansiapiapi, a small town in Riau, Indonesia. It is called tee long pan or tee cheong pan in the Hokkien dialect. Tee long pan is served with red chilli sauce, crushed roasted peanuts, fried shallots, and dried shrimp.

Vietnamese cuisine

In Vietnamese cuisine, there is a similar dish called bánh cuốn, and it is mostly eaten for breakfast. It is a crêpe-like roll made from a thin, wide sheet of rice noodle (similar to shahe fen) that can be filled with ground pork and other ingredients. Side dishes usually consist of chả lụa (Vietnamese pork sausage) and bean sprouts, while the dipping sauce is called nước chấm. Sometimes, a drop of cà cuống, which is the essence of a giant water bug, Lethocerus indicus, is added to the nước chấm for extra flavor, although this ingredient is scarce and quite expensive.

See also
 List of steamed foods
 List of stuffed dishes
 Zhaliang

References

Cantonese cuisine
Chinese rice dishes
Dim sum
Hong Kong cuisine
Steamed foods
Stuffed dishes